The Cadillac Square Building (also known as the Real Estate Exchange Building) was a building located at 17 Cadillac Square in Detroit, Michigan. It was constructed in 1918, and opened in 1919. It stood at 20 floors, with two basement floors, for a total of 22 stories. The high-rise was designed by architect Louis Kamper in the Neo-Gothic architectural style and shared similar characteristics and proportioning to the neighboring Cadillac Tower. The high-rise was built on the former site of a Salvation Army Hall, and was demolished between 1976 and early 1977. A parking lot took its place.

References

External links
Google Maps former location of the Cadillac Square Building

Buildings and structures demolished in 1976
Demolished buildings and structures in Detroit
Commercial buildings completed in 1919
Skyscraper office buildings in Detroit
Louis Kamper buildings